Object Lessons is "an essay and book series about the hidden lives of ordinary things". Each of the essays (2,000 words) and the books (25,000 words) investigate a single object through a variety of approaches that often reveal something unexpected about that object. As stated in the Object Lessons webpage, "Each Object Lessons project will start from a specific inspiration: an anthropological query, ecological matter, archeological discovery, historical event, literary passage, personal narrative, philosophical speculation, technological innovation—and from there develop original insights and novel lessons about the object in question."

Series publishers 
 The Atlantic 
 Bloomsbury Publishing

Series editors 
 Ian Bogost – Georgia Institute of Technology 
 Christopher Schaberg – Loyola University New Orleans 
 Haaris Naqvi – Bloomsbury Publishing

Books 
 Driver's License – Meredith Castile
 Remote Control – Caetlin Benson-Allott
 Golf Ball – Harry Brown 
 Drone – Adam Rothstein 
 Glass – John Garrison 
 Phone Booth – Ariana Kelly
 Refrigerator – Jonathan Rees
 Silence – John Biguenet 
 Hotel – Joanna Walsh
 Dust – Michael Marder 
 Shipping Container – Craig Martin 
 Hood – Alison Kinney
 Cigarette Lighter – Jack Pendarvis 
 Bookshelf – Lydia Pyne
 Bread – Scott Shershow
 Password – Martin Paul Eve
 Hair – Scott Lowe
 Waste – Brian Thill
 Questionnaire – Evan Kindley
 Egg - Nicole Walker
 Tree - Matthew Battles
 Blanket - Kara Thompson
 Shopping Mall - Matthew Newton
 Sock - Kim Adrian
 Eye Chart - William Germano
 Earth - Jeffrey Jerome Cohen and Lindy Elkins-Tanton
 Veil - Rafia Zakaria
 Tumor - Anne Leahy
 Personal Stereo - Rebecca Tuhus-Dubrow
 Jet Lag - Christopher J. Lee
 High Heel - Summer Brennan
 Traffic - Paul Josephson
 Whale Song - Margret Grebowicz
 Burger - Carol J. Adams
 Rust - Jean-Michel Rabaté
 Souvenir - Rolf Potts
 Luggage - Susan Harlan
 Train - A.N. Denvers
 Pixel - Ian Epstein
 Fog - Stephen Sparks
 Fat - Hanne Blank
 Doctor - Andrew Bomback
 Bicycle - Jonathan Maskit
 Fake - Kati Stevens
 Pill - Robert Bennett
 Potato - Rebecca Earle
 Bulletproof Vest - Kenneth R. Rosen
 Sticker - Henry Hoke

Reception 
"They are beautiful: elegant paperbacks, the quality kind, with front and back flaps, not quite pocket-sized but easily transportable, each coming in at under 200 pages, each inspired by an object. ... Billed as books about 'the hidden lives of ordinary things,' there are 10 so far, and every one a curiosity; not just an object, but a world in and of itself."—Los Angeles Review of Books

"In 1957 the French critic and semiotician Roland Barthes published Mythologies, a groundbreaking series of essays in which he analysed the popular culture of his day, from laundry detergent to the face of Greta Garbo, professional wrestling to the Citroën DS. This series of short books, 'Object Lessons', continues the tradition; subjects already covered include the remote control, driver's licence, shipping container and drone, with more to come."—Financial Times

References

External links

Essays and Mini Object Lessons

Series of books